Eleni Daniilidou was the defending champion, but did not compete this year.

Kim Clijsters won the title after Justine Henin-Hardenne was forced to retire due to a left wrist injury. The score was 6–7(4–7), 3–0.

Seeds
The first two seeds received a bye into the second round.

Draw

Finals

Top half

Bottom half

References

External links
 Official results archive (ITF)
 Official results archive (WTA)

Women's Singles
Singles